Barguna Polytechnic Institute is a government-owned polytechnic institute in Bangladesh. It was established in 2006 at Barguna, in Barguna District.

The institute is situated at Barguna near the 'Khakdon' river in Bangladesh.

History
Barguna Polytechnic Institute was established in 2006.

Student protests in June 2013 demanded the removal of Principal AZM Masudur Rahman over accusations of corruption and sexual harassment, allegations that he denied. The upazila nirbahi officer (UNO) formed a committee, led by the heads of the polytechnic's five departments, to investigate the charges. The Barguna-Mathbaria-Khulna road, on which the polytechnic is located, was blocked by protesters on multiple occasions. As the committee's investigation continued without result, the demonstrations became increasingly violent, culminating in a 19 June clash between police and about a thousand students in which 50 students and 5 police were injured, and 13 students were arrested. After that, students avoided campus, bringing classes to a halt. On 30 June, Mainul Ahsan was appointed acting principal, replacing Rahman, but the standoff between the administration and students continued for at least another 10 days.

Academics 
The polytechnic offers a four-year course of study leading to a Diploma in Engineering in one of five specialties:
 Computer Technology
 Electronics Technology
 Civil Technology
 Environment Technology
 Refrigeration and air conditioning Technology

Candidates have to take an admission test to be admitted. There are two shifts of classes, first shift in the morning and second shift later in the day.

References

External links 
 

Polytechnic institutes in Bangladesh
Educational institutions established in 2006
2006 establishments in Bangladesh